Axel Vennersten (20 January 1863 – 22 March 1948) was a Swedish politician and the ninth Speaker of Första kammaren of the Riksdag.

He was Minister for Finance from February 1914 to March 1917.

References

Swedish Ministers for Finance
Speakers of Första kammaren
Members of the Första kammaren
Knights of the Order of Charles XIII
1863 births
1948 deaths